The Mythology Tour is the first solo tour by British rock musician and singer-songwriter Barry Gibb formerly of the Bee Gees. It took its name from the Bee Gees'  box set of the same name.

Background
Gibb designed this tour in October 2012 as a celebration of his brothers Robin and Maurice. Gibb commented about the tour: "I am absolutely thrilled that Australian music lovers have embraced the Mythology Tour so wholeheartedly, given that it's the country where it all began. I am truly humbled by this response and can’t wait to perform these songs again on home soil.

This tour features his son Steve with Maurice's daughter, Samantha. As Gibb told Sydney Morning Herald: "As the place where we started so many years ago, we have always viewed Australia as our home so it is only fitting that we will be kicking off our Mythology tour there". By 5 October 2012, tickets for the tour were planned to go on sale. The tour began on 8 February 2013 with Gibb's concert at the Sydney Entertainment Centre in Sydney.

While Gibb performed "Spicks and Specks", there was a mini documentary shown on the video screen. Maurice's daughter, Samantha joined the band to sing "How Can You Mend a Broken Heart". Barry Gibb sang "I Started a Joke" for the first time with Robin singing the rest of the song on the video screen with the band.

In April 2013, Gibb announced his first solo UK tour and that he would play five dates in the United Kingdom and Ireland between 21 September and 3 October. The UK leg of the Mythology tour was promoted by Stuart Galbraith of Kilimanjaro Live. The US leg of the tour started in Boston in May 2014.

Setlist (Australian Leg)

Notes
 The show of 23 February in New Zealand titled 'Mission Estate Concert' on which the Wellington International Ukulele Orchestra and Carole King are special guests.

Tour dates

Festivals and other miscellaneous performances
This concert was part of the "Mission Estate Winery Concert"

Tour band 
Barry Gibb – lead vocal, guitar
Steve Gibb – guitar, lead vocals on "Fight The Good Fight", "On Time" and "I've Gotta Get a Message to You" (first verse)
Samantha Gibb – harmony vocals on "How Can You Mend a Broken Heart" and "Run to Me", and lead vocals on "Chain Reaction" and "If I Can't Have You"
Richard Bravo – percussion
Tim Cansfield – guitar
Beth Cohen – lead and backing vocals
Doug Emery – keyboards, backing vocals
Julio Hernandez – bass guitar
Lee Levin – drums
Charlotte McKinnon – backing vocals
Leesa Richards – backing vocals
Ben Stivers – keyboards
Dan Warner – lead guitar, backing vocals
John Merchant – Sound Engineer
Joe Lizano – Barry's guitar technician
Lazaro Rodríguez – Stephen's guitar technician

References

External links
Review of the concert in Melbourne
Review of the Mission Estate Concert

Barry Gibb
2013 concert tours
2014 concert tours